The canton of Limoges-9 is an administrative division of the Haute-Vienne department, western France. It was created at the French canton reorganisation which came into effect in March 2015. Its seat is in Limoges.

It consists of the following communes:
Isle
Limoges (partly)

References

Cantons of Haute-Vienne